The Trofeo Gianfranco Bianchin is a one-day cycling race held annually in Italy. It was part of UCI Europe Tour in category 1.2 from 2005 to 2012.

The race was created in honor of Italian professional cyclist Gianfranco Bianchin who died at the age of 23 in 1970.

Winners

References

Cycle races in Italy
UCI Europe Tour races
Recurring sporting events established in 1970
1970 establishments in Italy